Floyd John "Pete" Scott (December 21, 1897 – May 3, 1953) was a Major League Baseball player, who played outfielder for three seasons from 1926 - 1928. 

He made his debut with the Chicago Cubs during the 1926 season. In the 1927 off-season, he was traded to the Pittsburgh Pirates (along with Sparky Adams) for future Hall of Famer Hazen "Kiki" Cuyler.

In 208 games over three seasons, Scott posted a .303 batting average (158-for-522) with 95 runs, 41 doubles, 6 triples, 8 home runs, 88 RBIs, 59 bases on balls, .377 on-base percentage and .450 slugging percentage. He finished his career with a .975 fielding percentage, playing primarily at right and left field.

Scott died on May 3, 1953 in Daly City, California.

References

External links

1897 births
1953 deaths
Major League Baseball outfielders
Chicago Cubs players
Pittsburgh Pirates players
Kansas City Blues (baseball) players
Mission Reds players
Reading Keystones players
Seattle Indians players
Baseball players from California
Saint Mary's Gaels baseball players
People from Woodland, California